Serge Hazanavicius, was born 11 September 1963, in Paris. He is an actor and director, working primarily in France.

Personal life and family
His brother is Michel Hazanavicius. Their family is primarily of  Jewish ancestry. Their grandparents were originally from Lithuania and Poland and settled in France in the 1920s.

Theater

Filmography

Actor

Filmmaker

References

External links
 

1963 births
Male actors from Paris
French male film actors
French people of Lithuanian-Jewish descent
Living people